Ocnița is the seat of Ocnița district, Moldova.

Ocnița may also refer to:

Places in Romania
Ocnița, Dâmbovița, Dâmboviţa County, Romania
Ocnița, a village in Teaca Commune, Bistrița-Năsăud County, Romania
Ocnița, a village in Ocnele Mari town, Vâlcea County, Romania

Places in Moldova
Ocnița district, Moldova
Ocnița, Ocnița, a commune in Ocnița district, Moldova
Ocnița, Transnistria, a commune in Transnistria, Moldova
Ocnița-Răzeși, a village in Cucuruzeni Commune, Orhei district, Moldova
Ocnița-Țărani, a village in Zorile Commune, Orhei district, Moldova